Barrys Reef (previously known as Bayup and then Barry's Reef) is a town near Blackwood in Australia. The population of the town is 39.

The local story of the origin of Barrys Reef refers to a man who was exiled from the town of Blackwood (his name was Cocko) after a drunken brawl so he started walking to find a suitable place to live. After an hour of walking northwards away from Blackwood, the man (Barry Francis) found gold in the area and set up camp eventually building a house. Later on in the gold rush days Barry's Reef grew in size and at one stage had six hotels. After the gold rush the town eventually started to dwindle in population and was usually mistaken for North Blackwood. Nowadays the local people usually use the towns name as an excuse for not living in Blackwood or Trentham.

References

Towns in Victoria (Australia)
Mining towns in Victoria (Australia)